Thonny is an integrated development environment for Python that is designed for beginners. It was created by Aivar Annamaa, an Estonian programmer. It supports different ways of stepping through code, step-by-step expression evaluation, detailed visualization of the call stack and a mode for explaining the concepts of references and heap.

Features 
Line numbers
Statement stepping without breakpoints
Live variables during debugging
Stepping through evaluation of the expressions (expressions get replaced by their values)
Separate windows for executing function calls (for explaining local variables and call stack)
Variables and memory can be explained either by using simplified model (name → value) or by using more realistic model (name → address/id → value) 
Simple pip GUI
Support for CPython and MicroPython
Support for running and managing files on a remote machine via SSH
Possibility to log user actions for replaying or analyzing the programming process

Availability 
The program works on Windows, macOS and Linux. It is available as a binary bundle including the recent Python interpreter or pip-installable package. It can be installed via the operating-system package manager on Debian, Raspberry Pi, Ubuntu and Fedora.

Reception 
Thonny has received favorable reviews from Python and computer science education communities. 
It has been a recommended tool in several programming MOOCs.
Since June 2017 it has been included by default in the Raspberry Pi's official operating system distribution Raspberry Pi OS.

See also 

List of integrated development environments for Python programming language

References

External links 

Development site

Computer science education
Free integrated development environments for Python
Pedagogic integrated development environments
Python (programming language) software
Software using the MIT license